Tetridia is a monotypic moth genus of the family Crambidae described by William Warren in 1890. Its single species, Tetridia caletoralis, was described by Francis Walker in 1859. It is found in China, northern India, Sri Lanka, Myanmar, Malaysia, Papua New Guinea, Japan, Taiwan and Australia, where it has been recorded from Queensland.

Subspecies
Tetridia caletoralis caletoralis
Tetridia caletoralis interrupta (Rothschild, 1915) (Papua New Guinea)

References

Crambidae genera
Moths of Asia
Moths of Japan
Moths of Sri Lanka
Moths of Taiwan
Spilomelinae
Taxa named by William Warren (entomologist)
Monotypic moth genera